Jason Chan Pak-Yu (born 20 July 1983 as Ivan Chan) is a Hong Kong Canadian singer. He debuted under Sony Music in 2006 and released his debut album First Experience in 2007 and has since released more than 10 albums. He has been dubbed by the Hong Kong media as the music industry's "hidden master" (樂壇隱世高手). Chan has also ventured into film and television, and business, owning two bars in Hong Kong.

Life and career

Early life and career beginnings 
Chan was born in Hong Kong and moved to Canada when he was seven years old with his mother after his parents divorced. He has a younger sister. Chan attended Markville Secondary School in Markham, Ontario, and studied social work in university briefly. He returned to Hong Kong in 2005 and worked in customer service at an IT firm. After his friend sent his demo and recordings from a singing competition in Canada to Sony Music Hong Kong (then known as Sony BMG), he was offered a contract and signed with the label.

2006–2007: Debut and First Experience 
In 2006 he debuted with the single "Stubborn" 固執. Singles from his debut studio album First Experience was met with success. "Save Forever" 永久保存 was released in 2007, becoming Chan's first number one on RTHK and included in First Experience Reloaded. First Experience was certified gold by IFPI. Chan swept newcomer awards in 2007, including Best New Male Artist at the Metro Radio Hit Music Awards, Best Selling New Male Artist at the IFPI Hong Kong Top Sales Music Award, Most Popular Male Newcomer Silver prize at the Jade Solid Gold Best Ten Music Awards Presentation, and Best Prospect Award Gold prize at the 30th RTHK Top 10 Gold Songs Awards.

2008–2009: Change, Close Up, Can't Be Half, Put On 
On 30 May 2008 he issued his second album, Change. Its first single "I Miss You", featuring Fiona Fung peaked at number one on RTHK, and placed number two on the other three major stations (Ultimate 903, Metro Radio, and TVB). "Which Star are You From" 你來自那顆星 was released to radio stations as the second single, peaking at number two on TVB and Metro Radio. "Logic and Feelings" 理智與感情 featuring Taiwanese singer Rainie Yang was released as the third single; it topped the 988FM chart in Malaysia. Chan made his film debut in the movie Love is Elsewhere.

Close Up is Chan's first extended play, and was released on 13 May 2009. Two singles were released from the EP, "I will be Loving You", and "You Lie I Lie", with both songs reaching number one on the Ultimate Song Chart, and charted in the top five of the other local charts. Chan released full-length album Can't Be Half on 18 December, completing the year with singles "Half Dating" and "No Wrong Done", both penned by Lin Xi, to moderate chart success. Chan won Outstanding Artiste (Hong Kong) at the 9th Global Chinese Music Awards.

In 2010, 人外有人 from Can't Be Half was released to radio stations to moderate, success, peaking at number four on RTHK. Put On was released on 15 October 2010. Singles "Don't Fear Losing" 别怕失去 and "One Extra Love" 多此一爱 were released in support of the album. "Don't Fear Losing" reached number one on the Ultimate Song Chart.

Being managed by Song Music, Chan became a victim of the royalties controversy between the Hong Kong Recording Industry Alliance (HKRIA) and TVB, unable to make appearances on TVB's programmes, and no songs of his charted on the Jade Solid Gold Chart from late 2009 to 2014.

2011–2014: Quinquennium, Lost and Found, The Next Moment, and Tales 
Chan released his first greatest hits compilation Quinquennium on 23 June 2011, marking his fifth year in the industry. Four new songs were recorded for the compilation album: "Unlimited" 無限 (with labelmate Phil Lam), "Dignity" 尊嚴 , "Praise Myself" 讚讚自己, and "Looking From Afar"  望遠方, the Cantonese theme song for Korean drama Yi San. Chan played a supporting role in the film Lan Kwai Fong.

Lost and Found was released on 23 March 2012.

Released on 15 March 2013, The Next Moment was Chan's sixth studio album. Singles "Let the Bullets Fly", "Contradict", "People Around" were released as singles. Chan wrote six of the songs on the album, taking a much higher degree of creative control. A deluxe edition was issued 23 May, adding three music videos and footage from his Jason Chan & Friends The Next Moment mini-concert.

Tales was released 26 November 2013. In support of the album Chan headlined his first major concert, Tales Live 2013, at the Kowloonbay International Trade & Exhibition Centre Star Hall on 29 November 2013. The concert was released as a DVD+CD 31 March 2014 as TALES Live 2013/14.

2015–present: Escape, 10th anniversary and widespread recognition 
His 2015 studio album Escape was released in June and spawned his first all-kill single "A Look and a Smile" 回眸一笑. The second plug, "Missing You" 別來無恙, written by Phil Lam, topped three radio stations, but did not chart on Ultimate 903. On 23 June, he headlined a show Escape Live Session at the MacPherson Stadium to promote the album.

In February 2016 Chan starred in the musical Ever After directed by Edmond Tong, alongside Evelyn Choi. The musical was slotted for eight shows. An original soundtrack was released in support of the musical, containing three original tracks. The lead track "Ever After" was sent to radio stations, eventually reaching number one on all major stations. "Ever After" also won Chan awards at year-end award shows. On 5 June, Chan co-headlined concert KKBOX LIVE Jason Chan x Phil Lam Sing Together (陳柏宇 X 林奕匡 《一起唱》音樂會) at the Convention and Exhibition Centre. Chan returned to the charts with "The Last Episode", a jazz-oriented song. It reached number one on JSG, RTHK, and Metro Radio, and number two on Ultimate 903.

Commemorating the 10th anniversary of his career in the music industry, Chan released his second greatest hits album The Players. The album contained five new tracks and seven new versions of his greatest hits. "Without You I am Nothing" 沒有你，我什麼都不是 became Chan's second all-kill in the year. On 25–27 November, he hosted his anniversary concert The Players Live in Concert at the Kowloonbay International Trade & Exhibition Centre. A limited vinyl edition of The Players was released in March 2017.

Chan returned to the charts with single "The Walking Dead", his first collaboration with prolific lyricist Wyman Wong. Though not as acclaimed, the song managed to top the Ultimate Song Chart and the Metro Radio pop chart. On 24 November 2017 he released his tenth studio album I. Chan held his first Hong Kong Coliseum concert titled Speechless on 2 and 3 December.

On 1 January 2018 at the 2017 Ultimate Song Chart Awards Presentation, Chan was voted as My Favorite Male Singer, his first time winning the award. He again won Ultimate's Best Male Singer Silver Prize.

On 22 May 2018, Chan released "Infinite" (無限大). This song written for his daughter was favored by many radio stations and won two championships and two seasons. Due to the loss of vocal cords, the second annual title song "Seriously As Always" (認真如初). was postponed to 20 August 2018.

In March 2020, the World Wide Fund for Nature (WWF) Hong Kong Branch (WWF) once again invited Kay Tse and Jason Chan as ambassadors to promote sustainable living 

On 25 June 2021, Chan released 53FPS. The conceptual EP is noted for a change in arrangement from Chan's previous albums. The lead single "Such Thing As Emotions" (感情这回事) achieved commercial and critical success, topping three local radio stations and won Ultimate Song Chart Awards 2020 Top Ten Songs Number 8.

On 10 and 11 December 2021, Chan headlined his second Hong Kong Coliseum concert Fight For___Live.

Personal life
Chan married his long time girlfriend, Leanne Fu on 3 July 2017. The couple have four dogs and cats. On 7 April 2018, he posted an ultrasound photo of his wife Leanne Fu's belly on his social media accounts. Their daughter Abigail was born on 25 September 2018.

Controversy 
In 2017, Jason Chan took the lead in opening a store called "Yunchang Xiaolongkan Hotpot". In response to the question, Jason Chan insisted that the restaurant has obtained China's Xiaolongkan hot pot franchise. However, the real Xiaolongkan hot pot later stated an official channels that the company did not know the details of the "Yunchang Xiaolongkan Hot Pot" restaurant.

Discography

 First Experience (2007)
 Change (2008)
 Close Up (2009)
 Can't Be Half (2009)
 Put On (2010)
 Quinquennium (2011)
 Lost and Found (2012)
 The Next Moment (2013)
 Tales (2013)
 Escape (2015)
 The Players (2016)
 I (2017)
 Present (2018)
 Anyone But Jason (2019)
 53FPS (2021)

Filmography

References

External links
Jason's YouTube Channel

1983 births
Living people
Cantopop singers
Hong Kong emigrants to Canada
Hong Kong male film actors
Hong Kong male singers
Hong Kong singer-songwriters
Hong Kong male television actors
Male actors from Ontario
Musicians from Ontario
Naturalized citizens of Canada
People from Markham, Ontario
21st-century Hong Kong male actors
Sony Music Hong Kong artists